José Ramón Valente Vias (born 15 September 1962) is a Chilean politician and economist.

He completed his studies with an MBA at the University of Chicago (1988), being a student of Eugene Fama, Nobel Memorial Prize in Economic Sciences (2013).

He actively participated in Sebastián Piñera's 2017 presidential elections campaign as part of the economic team, where he later assumed the role of coordinator. After winning elections, Piñera appointed him Minister of Economy, Development and Tourism, a position that Valente assumed on 11 March until 13 June 2019, when he left the cabinet and was replaced by Juan Andrés Fontaine.

Works
 La historia de un sueño (2011)
 La rebelión del sentido común (2015)
 Los 4 largos años de la Nueva Mayoría (2017, coautor)

References

External links

1962 births
Living people
Chilean people
University of Chile alumni
University of Chicago alumni
21st-century Chilean politicians